The 2017 FIA European Rallycross Championship was the 42nd season of the FIA European Championships for Rallycross Drivers. The season consisted of nine rounds across three categories; Supercar, Super1600 and TouringCar. The season commencing on 1 April with the Spanish round at the Circuit de Barcelona-Catalunya, and culminating on 1 October in Germany at the Estering.

Swede Kevin Hansen was the defending Supercar champion, Hungarian Krisztián Szabó was defending Super1600 champion and Norwegian Ben-Philip Gundersen was defending TouringCar champion.

2017 champions were Anton Marklund (Supercar), Krisztián Szabó (Super1600) and Lars Øivind Enerberg (TouringCar).

Calendar

Entry list

Supercar

Super1600

TouringCar

Championship Standings
(key)

Supercar

a  Loss of ten championship points for presenting a turbocharger for sealing after initial scrutineering.
b Loss of five championship points for receiving his third reprimand of the season.
c Loss of ten championship points – stewards decision No.10.

Super1600

TouringCar

References

European Rallycross Championship seasons
European Rallycross Championship
FIA European Rallycross Championship